The 2012–13 season will be Al-Minaa's 37th season in the Iraqi Premier League, having featured in all 39 editions of the competition except two.

Squad

Transfers

In

Out
{| class="wikitable"
|-
! Date
! Pos.
! Name
! To
! Fee
|-
| September 2012
| MF
|  Ammar Abdul Hussein
|  Erbil
| –
|-
| September 2012
| MF
|  Mohammed Jabbar Shokan
|  Erbil
| –
|-
| September 2012
| DF
|  Safaa Jabbar
|  Naft Al-Janoob
| –
|-
| September 2012
| MF
|  Hassan Hadi Ahmed
|  Naft Al-Janoob
| –
|-
| September 2012
| FW
|   Mohammed Nasser Shakroun
|  Naft Al-Janoob
| –
|-
|-
| September 2012
| FW
|  Sultan Jassim
|  Naft Al-Janoob
| –
|-
| September 2012
| DF
|  Ali Jassim
|  Naft Al-Janoob
| –
|-
| September 2012
| DF
|  Mohammed Adnan
|  Kirkuk
| –
|-
| September 2012
| GK
|  Saddam Salman
| Retire
| –
|-
| September 2012
| DF
|  Sajjad Abdul Kadhim
| Retire
| –
|-
| September 2012
| FW
|  Ihsan Hadi
| Retire
| –
|-
| September 2012
| DF
|  Haider Abdul Hussein
| –
| –
|-
| September 2012
| DF
|  Hassan Chasib
| –
| –
|-
| September 2012
| MF
|  Bashar Hadi Ahmed
| –
| –
|-
| September 2012
| MF
|  Amjad Hameed
| –
| –
|-
| September 2012
| MF
|  Mohammed Ghazi
| –
| –
|-
| March 2013
| MF
|  Aurelien Oko Bota
|  Al Ahly
| –
|-

Technical staff
{| class="wikitable"
|-
! Position
! Name
|-
| Coach
|  Ghazi Fahad
|-
|  rowspan="2" |Assistant coach
|  Munir Jaber
|-
|  Ihsan Hadi
|-
| Fitness coach
|  Ali Lafta
|-
| Goalkeeping coach
|  Saddam Salman
|-
| Club doctor
|  Abdul Abbas Jabbar

Board members

Stadium
During the previous season, the stadium of Al-Mina'a demolished. A company will build a new stadium that will be completed in 2015. Since they can't play their games at Al Mina'a Stadium, they will be playing at Az-Zubair Olympic Stadium during this season.

Matches

Iraqi Premier League
 Away matches

 Home matches

Summary table

Top scorers

Sources
 Iraqi League 2012/2013
 Al-Minaa SC: Transfers and News
 Iraqia Sport TV

Al-Mina'a SC seasons
Al Mina